Yu Yiqun (born 12 January 1976) is a retired Chinese long jumper.

Her personal best jump was 6.77 metres, achieved at the 1998 Asian Games in Bangkok.

Achievements

References

1976 births
Living people
Chinese female long jumpers
Asian Games medalists in athletics (track and field)
Athletes (track and field) at the 1998 Asian Games
Asian Games silver medalists for China
Medalists at the 1998 Asian Games
20th-century Chinese women